Ali Parhizi (born 29 March 1983) is a German former professional footballer who played as a midfielder.

Career

Germany
Parhizi played for VfB Stuttgart as a youth. Having been unable to break through to the first team playing in the 2. Bundesliga at SSV Reutlingen, he joined Offenburger FV in January 2003. In December he wanted to leave the club.

Parhizi moved to Eintracht Trier from Heidenheimer SB in July 2006.

Indonesia
Parhizi scored his first goal for Bali Devata of the Liga Primer Indonesia on the 12th minute in a 2–2 tie with Tangerang Wolves.

Vietnam
In 2013, he trialled for Hải Phòng of the Vietnamese V.League 1.

Australia
Cleared to participate in games for Edgeworth of the Northern NSW State League in 2013, the midfielder was suspended for a week for his impetuous actions which earned him a second yellow card.

Career statistics

References

External links 
 SportsTG Profile 
 Cyprus Statistics

1983 births
Living people
German people of Iranian descent
Sportspeople of Iranian descent
German footballers
Association football midfielders
Oberliga (football) players
Cypriot First Division players
Offenburger FV players
APEP FC players
Bali Devata F.C. players
Edgeworth Eagles FC players
FC Kreuzlingen players
German expatriate footballers
German expatriate sportspeople in Switzerland
Expatriate footballers in Switzerland
German expatriate sportspeople in Cyprus
Expatriate footballers in Cyprus
German expatriate sportspeople in Indonesia
Expatriate footballers in Indonesia
German expatriate sportspeople in Vietnam
Expatriate footballers in Vietnam
German expatriate sportspeople in Australia
Expatriate soccer players in Australia
Footballers from Stuttgart